The Huon Highway is an  highway in southern Tasmania, Australia. The highway forms part of the A6 and connects Hobart with the southern parts of Tasmania. The original Huon Highway (now known as  Huon Road) was a twisty two-lane road skirting around Mount Wellington, but that section of the highway was bypassed in stages when the Southern Outlet was completed in 1968. This provided a more direct, and higher traffic-capacity, route between Hobart and the Huon Valley. A few sections of the old highway remain, all within the Huon Valley, and have been upgraded.

See also

 Highways in Australia
 List of highways in Tasmania

References

Highways in Tasmania